House of Harmony is a 2005 S$7 million German-Singaporean telemovie.  Jointly produced by 4 parties - Germany's FFP Media and ZDF Pictures, together with Singapore's Oak 3 Films and Media Development Authority (MDA), the telemovie was shot in four languages - Spanish, English, German, and Mandarin.

It is based on the 1998 novel Perfect Harmony by Barbara Wood.

Plot summary
Singapore in the 1920s sets the stage for the dramatic romance between a young Asian woman (Fann Wong) and a married American industrialist (Philippe Brenninkmeyer). It is a love doomed by laws and tradition, but which yields a child, Harmony (Maggie Q).

After finishing her studies, she goes to America and becomes a successful maker and distributor of herbal medicines. She also falls in love with her father's adopted son (Daniel Morgenroth), but is reviled by the young man's racially and socially bigoted mother. The story revolves around whether the two lovers could overcome all barriers and be together.

Cast
 Fann Wong - Mei Ling
 Philippe Brenninkmeyer - Richard Barclay
 Maggie Q - Harmony
 Daniel Morgenroth - Gideon Barclay
 Monika Peitsch - Fiona Barclay
 Zhu Houren - Chang Suyin
 Cheng Pei-pei - Amah
 Claudine Wilde - Olivia Wilson
 Andrea Jonasson - Marie Larousse
 Jason Chan - Michael Lee
 Amy Cheng - Mrs. Wah

Viewership
House of Harmony has been telecast in Germany, Austria, France and Belgium to a combined prime-time viewership of over 80 million.

Awards
House of Harmony won a Silver Award in the 2005 Queensland Awards for Cinematography, by the Australian Cinematographers Society.

References

External links
 

2005 films
2005 television films
German television films
2000s German-language films
German-language television shows
English-language German films
2000s Mandarin-language films
Singaporean romantic drama films
Films set in Singapore
Films set in the United States
Television shows based on American novels
ZDF original programming
German romantic drama films
Singaporean television films
2000s German films